Valla is a suburb in the Nambucca Valley, on the Mid North Coast of New South Wales, Australia. The name was chosen to match that of the British residence of nineteenth century diplomat Andrew Buchanan.

History
Deep Creek Post Office opened on 16 November 1905, was renamed Valla in 1906 and closed in 1942.

Surfing
Valla Beach has a range of surf spots. South Beach is usually an easy wave but with swell can get fun for experienced surfers. North Valla is a wave for the more experienced surfers. It is known for its long right over rocks and further down the beach has a fast A-frame good for all surfers in average swells.

Demographics 
The population of Valla is predominantly Australian born (78 per cent) and English-speaking (90 per cent). Places of birth other than Australia include the United Kingdom, the Netherlands, New Zealand and Poland. Valla residents are significantly older than the state average, with more than a quarter of the population over 65 years. The average age is 50 years compared to a state average of 37.

Industries and services 
The village was formerly a logging town, surrounded by red cedar forest. A remnant logging industry remains as part of the adjacent state forests administered by the New South Wales Department of Primary Industries. More recent industries include macadamia plantations and tourism.

Village services include a pub, pharmacy, real estate agent, cafe/general store, community preschool and a caravan park. The nearby Valla Beach is well known for surfing.

A railway station was located in the village on the North Coast railway between 1939 and 1974.

References 

Mid North Coast
Towns in New South Wales
Coastal towns in New South Wales